This article contains a list of fossil-bearing stratigraphic units in the state of Arkansas, U.S.

Sites

See also

 Paleontology in Arkansas

References

 

Arkansas
Stratigraphic units
Stratigraphy of Arkansas
Arkansas geography-related lists
United States geology-related lists